Killik & Co is a British retail investment company and independent Partnership, providing advice on savings, planning and investment to retail investors through a network of branches in the UK, managing assets on behalf of 19,000 clients.

History 
Killik & Co was founded in the late 1980s as a stockbroking firm by entrepreneurs Paul Killik and Matthew Orr. It is one of the few remaining independent Partnerships in the UK retail investing market following consolidation amongst European, Japanese and American investment banks following the Big Bang in the late 1980s. The company is formatted "on traditional lines to provide a personal advisory service to clients from the day they first walk through the door".

Killik & Co is headquartered in Grosvenor Street, Mayfair, with 6 branches.

Awards 
The company has won multiple awards, including the 2021 Investors Chronicle & Financial Times Reader's Choice Investor Champion of the Year.

References

Investment companies of the United Kingdom